Shah Verdi or Shahverdi literally means "Shah gave" in some languages. It may refer to

People
Shah Verdi Khan, the last atabeg of Lesser Luristan of the Khorshidi dynasty
Shah Verdi Khan (Georgian) (fl. 17th-century), Safavid official of Georgian origin
Shahverdi Khan of Ganja
Shahverdi Sultan

Places
Shahverdi, Iran
Shahverdi, Isfahan, Iran

See also